The western limestone ctenotus (Ctenotus australis) is a species of skink, a lizard in the family Scincidae. The species is endemic to Australia.

Geographic range
C. australis is native to coastal areas in the southwestern part of Western Australia.

Habitat
C. australis is found amongst heath on coastal dunes, and in open woodland on the Swan Coastal Plain. It is generally restricted to areas with limestone.

Description
The western limestone ctenotus is quite large for a ctenotus. It is a light brown colour, but over this is a complex, prominent pattern of black, white and brown stripes.

Reproduction
C. australis is oviparous.

References

Further reading
Cogger HG (2014). Reptiles and Amphibians of Australia, Seventh Edition. Clayton, Victoria, Australia: CSIRO Publishing. xxx + 1,o33 pp. .
Gray JE (1838). "Catalogue of the Slender-tongued Saurians, with Descriptions of many new Genera and Species". Ann. Mag. Nat. Hist., First Series 2: 287–293. (Tiliqua australis, new species, p. 291).
Wilson, Steve; Swan, Gerry (2013). A Complete Guide to Reptiles of Australia, Fourth Edition. Sydney: New Holland Publishers. 522 pp. .

Reptiles of Western Australia
Reptiles described in 1838
Skinks of Australia
Ctenotus
Taxa named by John Edward Gray